SEK (Sidirodromoi Ellinikou Kratous, Hellenic State Railways) Class Θγ (or Class Thg; Theta-gamma) was a class of 2-8-0 steam locomotives ex-United States Army Transportation Corps S160 type.  27 locomotives were acquired in 1947; Θγ521–537 were coal burners,  while Θγ551–560 were oil burners.  In 1959, Italian Railways (Ferrovie dello Stato, FS) sold another 25, formerly Class 736, Nos 736.011/23/40/55/73/90/101/2/126/7/131/5/51/8/60/4/6/78/88/90/9/203/7/9/17 to SEK.  These were renumbered Θγ571-95 in the same order.

Stock list 

A few still survive in scrapyard condition. Four are at Thessaloniki Old Depot (Θγ 525, 532, 535, 584), one is outside Thessaloniki current depot (Θγ 593) whilst one more survives at Tithorea depot (Θγ 576). Θγ 575 is under overhaul at Tyseley Locomotive Works in Great Britain

See also
 USATC S160 Class

References

Θγ
2-8-0 locomotives
Steam locomotives of Greece
Railway locomotives introduced in 1947
ALCO locomotives
Baldwin locomotives
Lima locomotives
USATC S160 Class
Standard gauge locomotives of Greece
1′D h2 locomotives